Sangju Joo clan is one of the Korean clans. Their Bon-gwan was in Sangju, North Gyeongsang Province. According to the research held in 2000, the number of Sangju Joo clan's family was 5631, and the number of Sangju Joo clan was 18147. Their founder was  who was naturalized in Silla from Tang dynasty.

See also 
 Korean clan names of foreign origin

References

External links 
 

 
Korean clan names of Chinese origin
Ju clans